Świnna  is a village in Żywiec County, Silesian Voivodeship, in southern Poland. It is the seat of the gmina (administrative district) called Gmina Świnna.

The village has a population of 1,891.

References

Villages in Żywiec County